The Pennsylvania League was a six–team Independent level baseball minor league that played in the 1903 and 1904 seasons. The Pennsylvania League featured franchises based exclusively in Pennsylvania. The Pennsylvania League permanently folded after the 1904 season.

History
The Pennsylvania League formed as Independent level minor league that played in 1903. The 1903 member teams, standings and statistics are unknown.

The 1904 Pennsylvania League continued play as a six–team Independent league. The Pennsylvania League hosted franchises based in Carlisle, Pennsylvania, Chester, Pennsylvania, Coatesville, Pennsylvania, Johnstown, Pennsylvania (Johnstown Johnnies), Oxford, Pennsylvania and Pottstown, Pennsylvania. Team records and statistics of the 1904 league are unknown.

The Pennsylvania League permanently folded after the 1904 season.

In 1905, Coatesville and the Johnstown Johnnies became charter members of the Tri-State League, which was an Independent eight–team league

Pennsylvania League teams

Pennsylvania League overall standings
The 1903 and 1904 Pennsylvania League records are unknown. The order of the 1904 standings is listed as Carlisle in 1st place followed by Chester, Coatesville, Johnstown Johnnies, Oxford and Pottstown, which is also alphabetical.

1904

Notable alumni
Hans Lobert (1904), Johnstown
Jock Menefee (1904), Johnstown
Mike Mowrey (1904), Chester
Mike Smith (1904), Johnstown

References

Defunct minor baseball leagues in the United States
Baseball leagues in Pennsylvania
Defunct professional sports leagues in the United States
Sports leagues established in 1903
Sports leagues disestablished in 1904